Victor Joseph Henri Fastre (19 May 1890 – 12  September 1914) was a Belgian racing cyclist. He won Liège–Bastogne–Liège in 1909.

Personal life and death
Fastre was son of Hubert Henri Joseph Fastre and his wife Marie Catherine Sophie (nee Leuwen). Enlisted in the Belgian Army in 1910, he was killed in action within Belgium during World War I.

Palmarès 
1909
Liège–Bastogne–Liège

References

External links 

1890 births
1914 deaths
Sportspeople from Liège
Cyclists from Liège Province
Belgian male cyclists
Belgian military personnel killed in World War I